Bowerman Airport , also known as Bowerman Field, is a public use airport located  west of the central business district of Hoquiam, a city in Grays Harbor County, Washington, United States. It is owned by the Port of Grays Harbor. According to the FAA's National Plan of Integrated Airport Systems for 2009–2013, it is classified as a general aviation airport.

Facilities and aircraft 

For the 12-month period ending May 31, 2011, the airport had 24,625 aircraft operations, an average of 69 per day: 97% general aviation and 3% military. At that time there were 25 aircraft based at this airport, all single-engine. Bowerman Field airport has fueling facilities and is the only jet-capable airport on the Washington coast. The airport has an instrument landing approach system for use in instrument meteorological conditions.

References

External links 
 Aerial photo as of 21 June 1990 from USGS The National Map
 

Airports in Washington (state)
Transportation buildings and structures in Grays Harbor County, Washington